Two Smart Men is a 1940 British comedy film directed by Widgey R. Newman and starring Leslie Fuller, Wally Patch and Margaret Yarde.  The film's producer-director Newman had specialized in quota quickies during the previous decade and this production was made as a second feature. It was followed by Henry Steps Out with several of the same cast.

Cast
 Leslie Fuller as Jimmy  
 Wally Patch as Wally  
 Margaret Yarde as Mrs. Smith  
 Pamela Bevan as Pamela  
 George Turner as Henry Smith

References

Bibliography
 Chibnall, Steve & McFarlane, Brian. The British 'B' Film. Palgrave MacMillan, 2009.

External links

1940 films
British comedy films
1940 comedy films
Films shot at Associated British Studios
Films directed by Widgey R. Newman
Films set in England
British black-and-white films
Quota quickies
1940s English-language films
1940s British films